A banner drop is the protest action of putting a banner in public place to spread a message and raise awareness.  The banner may target a corporation, a law, a political campaign, or any activism. The banner may itself be dropped on an activists' target, or in conjunction with the beginning of a campaign.

Performing a banner drop may constitute criminal vandalism and criminal trespassing depending on where the banner is placed and on the legal jurisdiction in which the activity occurred.

There are several ways in which banners are constructed and placed. Most often, a banner is decorated with an activist slogan or picture using paint, dye or, in some cases, screen printing. The banner is then often either tied to the target or secured to it using ropes and weights.

Global banner drop 

#BridgesNotWalls was a global banner drop campaign to protest against Donald Trump's stance on immigration. On January 20, 2017, the day of Trump's presidential inauguration, activists around the world dropped banners from over 200 iconic bridges across five continents.

In London, banners were dropped from at least eight bridges spanning the River Thames including the Tower Bridge, London Bridge, Southwark, Millennium, Blackfriars, Waterloo, Westminster and Vauxhall bridges. Other historic bridges were scenes of banner drops including Ironbridge in England, North Bridge in Scotland, Dyfi Bridge in Wales, Oberbaum Bridge in Germany, Auckland Harbour Bridge in New Zealand, as well as bridges in Australia, France, Ireland, Nepal, and the United States. Rallies were also held in Japan, the Philippines, Belgium, Tokyo, and Moscow.

Gallery 

Banner drops can vary greatly. Here are some samples of actual banner drops.

See also 
 Vertical protest banners

References

External links 
 Banner drop guide by Amnesty International (2019)

Protest tactics
Vandalism